Nasrabad-e Seyyed Ahmad (also Romanized as Naşrābād-e Seyyed Aḩmad; also known as Saiyid Ahmad and Seyyed Aḩmad) is a village in Fathabad Rural District, in the Central District of Qasr-e Shirin County, Kermanshah Province, Iran. At the 2006 census, its population was 332, in 83 families.

References 

Populated places in Qasr-e Shirin County